Li Rongxiang (born January 18, 1972, in Zhejiang) is a male javelin thrower from PR China. His personal best throw is 84.29 metres, achieved in May 2000 in Chengdu.

Achievements

Seasonal bests by year
1991 - 79.30
1998 - 81.81
1999 - 82.72
2000 - 84.29
2001 - 81.80
2002 - 82.75
2003 - 81.76
2004 - 83.32
2005 - 81.61
2006 - 79.96

References

1972 births
Living people
Athletes (track and field) at the 2004 Summer Olympics
Chinese male javelin throwers
Olympic athletes of China
Athletes from Zhejiang
Asian Games medalists in athletics (track and field)
Athletes (track and field) at the 1998 Asian Games
Athletes (track and field) at the 2002 Asian Games
Athletes (track and field) at the 2006 Asian Games
Asian Games gold medalists for China
Asian Games bronze medalists for China
Medalists at the 1998 Asian Games
Medalists at the 2002 Asian Games
Medalists at the 2006 Asian Games
20th-century Chinese people
21st-century Chinese people